Hypostasis (plural: hypostases), from the Greek: ὑπόστασις, hypóstasis) is the underlying state or underlying substance and is the fundamental reality that supports all else. In Neoplatonism the hypostasis of the soul, the intellect (nous) and  "the one" was addressed by Plotinus. In Christian theology, the Holy Trinity consists of three hypostases: Hypostasis of the Father, Hypostasis of the Son, and Hypostasis of the Holy Spirit.

Ancient Greek philosophy
Pseudo-Aristotle used hypostasis in the sense of material substance.

Neoplatonists argue that beneath the surface phenomena that present themselves to our senses are three higher spiritual principles, or hypostases, each one more sublime than the preceding. For Plotinus, these are the Soul, the Intellect, and the One.

Christian theology

The term hypostasis has a particular significance in Christian theology, particularly in Christian Triadology (study of the Holy Trinity), and also in Christology (study of Christ).

Hypostasis in Christian Triadology
In Christian Triadology (study of the Holy Trinity) three specific theological concepts have emerged throughout history, in reference to number and mutual relations of divine hypostases: 
 monohypostatic (or miahypostatic) concept advocates that God has only one hypostasis; 
 dyohypostatic concept advocates that God has two hypostases (Father and Son); 
 trihypostatic concept advocates that God has three hypostases (Father, Son and the Holy Spirit).

Hypostasis in Christology
Within Christology, two specific theological concepts have emerged throughout history, in reference to the Hypostasis of Christ: 
 monohypostatic concept (in Christology) advocates that Christ has only one hypostasis; 
 dyohypostatic concept (in Christology) advocates that Christ has two hypostases (divine and human).

History of use

In early Christian writings, hypostasis was used to denote "being" or "substantive reality" and was not always distinguished in meaning from terms like ousia ('essence'), substantia ('substance') or qnoma (specific term in Syriac Christianity). It was used in this way by Tatian and Origen and also in the anathemas appended to the Nicene Creed of 325.

It was mainly under the influence of the Cappadocian Fathers that the terminology was clarified and standardized so that the formula "three hypostases in one ousia" came to be accepted as an epitome of the orthodox doctrine of the Trinity. The first person to propose a difference in the meanings of hypostasis and ousía, and for using hypostasis as synonym of Person, was Basil of Caesarea, namely in his letters 214 (375 A.D.) and 236 (376 A.D.) Specifically, Basil of Caesarea argues that the two terms are not synonymous and that they, therefore, are not to be used indiscriminately in referring to the Godhead. He writes:

This consensus, however, was not achieved without some confusion at first in the minds of Western theologians since in the West the vocabulary was different. Many Latin-speaking theologians understood hypo-stasis as "sub-stantia" (substance); thus when speaking of three "hypostases" in the Godhead, they might suspect three "substances" or tritheism. However, from the middle of the fifth century onwards, marked by Council of Chalcedon, the word came to be contrasted with ousia and used to mean "individual reality," especially in the trinitarian and Christological contexts. The Christian concept of the Trinity is often described as being one God existing in three distinct hypostases/personae/persons.

John Calvin's Continuity with Patristic Tradition 
"The word ὑπόστασις which, by following others, I have rendered substance, denotes not, as I think, the being or essence of the Father, but his person; for it would be strange to say that the essence of God is impressed on Christ, as the essence of both is simply the same. But it may truly and fitly be said that whatever peculiarly belongs to the Father is exhibited in Christ, so that he who knows him knows what is in the Father. And in this sense do the orthodox fathers take this term, hypostasis, considering it to be threefold in God, while the essence (οὐσία) is simply one. Hilary everywhere takes the Latin word substance for person. But though it be not the Apostle’s object in this place to speak of what Christ is in himself, but of what he is really to us, yet he sufficiently confutes the Asians and Sabellians; for he claims for Christ what belongs to God alone, and also refers to two distinct persons, as to the Father and the Son. For we hence learn that the Son is one God with the Father, and that he is yet in a sense distinct from him, so that a subsistence or person belongs to both."

See also

 Haecceity – a term used by the followers of Duns Scotus to refer to that which formally distinguishes one thing from another with a common nature
 Hypokeimenon
 Hypostatic union
 Hypostatic abstraction
 Instantiation principle
 Kalyptos in Gnosticism
 Noema – a similar term used by Edmund Husserl
 Prakṛti – a similar term found in Hinduism
 Principle of individuation
 Prosopon or persona
 Reification (fallacy)
 Substance theory

References

Sources 

 
 
 
 
 
 
 
 
 
 
 
 
 
 
 
 
 

Ancient Christian controversies
Christian terminology
Christianity and Hellenistic philosophy
Christology
Concepts in ancient Greek metaphysics
New Testament Greek words and phrases
Theories in ancient Greek philosophy
Trinitarianism
Nature of Jesus Christ